TRAPPIST-1d, also designated as 2MASS J23062928-0502285 d, is a small exoplanet (about 30% the mass of the Earth), which orbits on the inner edge of the habitable zone of the ultracool dwarf star TRAPPIST-1 approximately 40 light-years (12.1 parsecs, or nearly  km) away from Earth in the constellation of Aquarius. The exoplanet was found by using the transit method, in which the dimming effect that a planet causes as it crosses in front of its star is measured. The first signs of the planet were announced in 2016, but it wasn't until the following years that more information concerning the probable nature of the planet was obtained. TRAPPIST-1d is the least massive planet of the system and is likely to have a compact hydrogen-poor atmosphere similar to Venus, Earth, or Mars. It receives just 4.3% more sunlight than Earth, placing it on the inner edge of the habitable zone. It has about <5% of its mass as a volatile layer, which could consist of atmosphere, oceans, and/or ice layers. Recent studies by the University of Washington have concluded that TRAPPIST-1d might be a Venus-like exoplanet with an uninhabitable atmosphere. The planet is an eyeball planet candidate.

Physical characteristics

Radius, mass, and temperature
TRAPPIST-1d was detected with the transit method, allowing scientists to accurately determine its radius. The planet is about 0.784  with a small error margin of about 147 km. Transit timing variations and complex computer simulations helped accurately determine the mass of the planet, which led to scientists being able to calculate its density, surface gravity, and composition. TRAPPIST-1d is a mere 0.297 , making it one of the least massive exoplanets yet found. It has 61.6% the density of Earth (3.39 g/cm3) and just under half the gravity. Both its mass, density, and surface gravity are the lowest in the entire TRAPPIST-1 system. Compared to Mars, it has nearly three times that planet's mass but is still significantly less dense, which would indicate the presence of a significant atmosphere; models of the low density of TRAPPIST-1d indicates a mainly rocky composition, but with about ≤5% of its mass in the form of a volatile layer. The volatile layer of TRAPPIST-1d may consist of atmosphere, ocean, and/or ice layers.

Orbit
TRAPPIST-1d is a closely orbiting planet, with one full orbit taking just 4.05 days (about 97 hours) to complete. It orbits at a distance of just 0.02228 AU from the host star, or about 2.2% the distance between Earth and the Sun. For comparison, Mercury, the Solar System's innermost planet, takes 88 days to orbit at a distance of about 0.38 AU. The size of TRAPPIST-1 and the close orbit of TRAPPIST-1d around it means that the star as seen from the planet appears 5.5 times as large as the Sun from the Earth. While a planet at TRAPPIST-1d's distance from the Sun would be a scorched world, the low luminosity of TRAPPIST-1 means that the planet gets only 1.043 times the sunlight that Earth receives, placing it within the inner part of the conservative habitable zone.

Host star

The planet orbits an (M-type) ultracool dwarf star named TRAPPIST-1. The star has a mass of 0.089  (close to the boundary between brown dwarfs and hydrogen-fusing stars) and a radius of 0.121 . In comparison, the Sun is 4.6 billion years old and has a temperature of 5778 K (5504.85 °C, 9940.73 °F). The star is metal-rich, with a metallicity ([Fe/H]) of 0.04, or 109% the solar amount. This is particularly odd as such low-mass stars near the boundary between brown dwarfs and hydrogen-fusing stars should be expected to have considerably less metals than the Sun. Its luminosity is 0.05% of that of the Sun.

Stars like TRAPPIST-1 have the ability to live up to 4–5 trillion years, 400–500 times longer than the Sun will live (the Sun only has about 8 billion years of lifespan left, slightly more than half of its lifetime). Because of this ability to live for long periods of time, it is likely TRAPPIST-1 will be one of the last remaining stars when the Universe is much older than it is now, when the gas needed to form new stars will be exhausted, and the remaining ones begin to die off.

The star's apparent magnitude, or how bright it appears from Earth's perspective, is 18.8. Therefore, it is too dim to be seen with the naked eye (the limit for that is 6.5).

The star is not just very small and far away, it also emits comparatively little visible light, mainly shining in the invisible infrared. Even from the close in proximity of TRAPPIST-1d, about 50 times closer than Earth is from the Sun, the planet receives less than 1% the visible light Earth sees from the Sun. This would probably make the days on TRAPPIST-1d never brighter than twilight is on Earth. However, that still means that TRAPPIST-1 could easily shine at least 3000 times brighter in the sky of TRAPPIST-1d than the full moon does in Earth's night sky.

Habitability

Models and scientists are divided on whether their convergent solutions from the data for TRAPPIST-1d indicates Earth-like habitability or a severe greenhouse effect.

In some respects, this exoplanet is one of the most Earth-like found. It does not have a hydrogen or helium-based atmosphere, which makes larger planets uninhabitable (the planet is not massive enough to retain light gases).

The planet is located at the inner edge of the expected habitable zone of its parent star (where liquid water can reasonably be expected to exist on its surface). The planet may also have liquid and atmospheric water, up to many times more than Earth. However, some three-dimensional modeling solutions have a little water surviving beyond the early hot phase in the planet's history. Most models by the University of Washington for TRAPPIST-1d strongly converge on a Venus-like planet (runaway greenhouse effect) with an uninhabitable atmosphere.

Because TRAPPIST-1d is only ~30% the Earth's mass, it, like Venus and Mars, may have no magnetic field, which would allow the parent star's solar wind to strip away the more volatile components of its atmosphere (including water), leaving it hydrogen-poor like those planets. However, due to its close orbit, TRAPPIST-1d is likely tidally locked and it may be very geologically active due to tidal squeezing as happens to Jupiter's moon Io and the volcanic gases could replenish the atmosphere lost to the solar wind. TRAPPIST-1d may resist this the tidal heating, especially if it has an Earth-like albedo of ≥0.3, according to other analyses. The same researchers point out that such proximity to the host star tends to increase geothermal activity, and tidally heat the bottom of any seas. If the planet has suffered a runaway greenhouse, its atmosphere should be thinner and cooler than Venus', due to its smaller mass and the fact it only receives about as much radiation as the Earth (while Venus receives about twice as much).

The lack of a magnetic field will also result in the surface receiving more charged particles than the Earth does. And if the planet is tidally locked, a dense atmosphere could be enough to transfer heat from the illuminated side to the much colder dark side.

Discovery 
A team of astronomers headed by Michaël Gillon of the Institut d’Astrophysique et Géophysique at the University of Liège in Belgium used the TRAPPIST (Transiting Planets and Planetesimals Small Telescope) telescope at the La Silla Observatory in the Atacama desert, Chile, to observe TRAPPIST-1 and search for orbiting planets. By utilising transit photometry, they discovered three Earth-sized planets orbiting the dwarf star; the innermost two are tidally locked to their host star while the outermost appears to lie either within the system's habitable zone or just outside of it. The team made their observations from September to December 2015 and published its findings in the May 2016 issue of the journal Nature.

The original claim and presumed size of the planet was revised when the full seven-planet system was revealed in 2017:

"We already knew that TRAPPIST-1, a small, faint star some 40 light years away, was special. In May 2016, a team led by Michaël Gillon at Belgium’s University of Liege announced it was closely orbited by three planets that are probably rocky: TRAPPIST-1b, c and d...

"As the team kept watching shadow after shadow cross the star, three planets no longer seemed like enough to explain the pattern. “At some point we could not make sense of all these transits,” Gillon says.

"Now, after using the space-based Spitzer telescope to stare at the system for almost three weeks straight, Gillon and his team have solved the problem: TRAPPIST-1 has four more planets.

"The planets closest to the star, TRAPPIST-1b and c, are unchanged. But there’s a new third planet, which has taken the d moniker, and what had looked like d before turned out to be glimpses of e, f and g. There’s a planet h, too, drifting farthest away and only spotted once."

See also 
 List of potentially habitable exoplanets

References

Exoplanets discovered in 2016
Near-Earth-sized exoplanets in the habitable zone
Transiting exoplanets
TRAPPIST-1
Aquarius (constellation)